Hibbertia bicarpellata is a species of flowering plant in the family Dilleniaceae and is endemic to northern Queensland. It is a shrub with hairy, ridged branches, elliptic leaves and yellow flowers arranged singly in leaf axils, with twenty to twenty-six stamens arranged in groups around the two carpels.

Description
There are twenty to twenty-six stamens arranged around the two carpels, each carpel with four ovules. Flowering occurs from February to September.

Taxonomy
Hibbertia bicarpellata was first formally described in 2010 by Hellmut R. Toelken in the Journal of the Adelaide Botanic Gardens from specimens collected by Richard Schodde in the Moomin Forest Reserve in 1963. The specific epithet (bicarpellata) means "two carpelled", referring to the difference between this species and Hibbertia melhanioides, in which this species was previously included.

Distribution and habitat
This hibbertia usually grows in forest and is found on parts of the Atherton Tableland in northern Queensland.

Conservation status
Hibbertia bicarpellata is classified as of "least concern" under the Queensland Government Nature Conservation Act 1992.

See also
List of Hibbertia species

References

bicarpellata
Flora of Queensland
Plants described in 2010
Taxa named by Hellmut R. Toelken